The Field Elm cultivar Ulmus minor  'Reverti' is a University of Wisconsin–Madison selection (No. 380-1), registered and named in Germany in 1993 by Conrad Appel, Darmstadt (ceased trading c. 2006).

Description

Not available.

Cultivation
'Reverti' was grown from Hungarian seed and found to the most disease-resistant of the species in the Wisconsin programme.
The tree is now in commerce in the Netherlands.

Accessions

Europe
Grange Farm Arboretum, Sutton St. James, Spalding, Lincolnshire, UK. Acc. no. 1082.

Nurseries

Europe

Noordplant , Glimmen, Netherlands.

References

Field elm cultivar
Ulmus articles with images
Ulmus